HMS Mastiff  was a Thornycroft M-class destroyer which fought in the First World War as part of the Royal Navy. As a variant of the M-class destroyer, the ship had 6,800 horsepower more than the conventional design, enabling the ship to achieve a speed of 37.5 knots during its sea trials.  She was reputed to be the fasted ship in service in 1915.

History
The ship was laid down 10 July 1913, launched 5 September 1914 and completed 12 November 1914.

The ship was assigned to the 1st Destroyer Flotilla in December 1914 and then transferred to the 3rd Destroyer Flotilla in January 1915. On 24 January 1915, the ship took part in the Battle of Dogger Bank.

In March 1915, the destroyer was transferred to the 10th Destroyer Flotilla and served as part of the Harwich Force.

In April 1918, the destroyer was assigned to 'Outer Patrol off Ostend' during the Zeebrugge Raid.

The ship was sold for breaking up 9 May 1921.

A model of the ship is in the collections of the National Maritime Museum in Greenwich.

References

Thornycroft M-class destroyers
1914 ships
World War I destroyers of the United Kingdom